Frontier Communications of Virginia, Inc. is an operating company created in 2009 to take over operations in Crows, Virginia and Hematite, Virginia (located in Alleghany County that had been served by Verizon Virginia (formerly The Chesapeake and Potomac Telephone Company of Virginia).

Frontier Communications purchased Verizon West Virginia from Verizon Communications effective July 1, 2010. Because the Crows-Hematite central office, located on the state line of Virginia and West Virginia, received its dial tone from a central office in West Virginia, operations in Alleghany County were split from the former C&P Telephone Company of Virginia and transferred to Frontier.

References

Frontier Communications
Communications in Virginia
Telecommunications companies of the United States
Telecommunications companies established in 2009
Bell System
Verizon Communications